The LFG V 40 and V 44 were one-off, single-engine, two-seat sports monoplanes, identical apart from their engines, built in Germany in 1925.

Design and development
The V 40 and V 44 were all-metal high-wing monoplanes, with thick, straight-edged, cantilever wings.  Highly stressed members were steel, with duralumin elsewhere including the skin.  The fuselages were deep-bellied and flat-sided with tandem open cockpits over the wing.  On both aircraft, the pilot sat near the quarter chord position, with a slot in the fuselage below the wing to enhance his downward view, and the passenger was placed within a cut-out in the trailing edge.  The tailplane was on top of the fuselage and the rounded vertical tail included a balanced rudder which extended down to the keel.  The conventional undercarriage was fixed, with mainwheels on a single axle mounted on short V-struts and assisted by a tailskid.

The V 40 and V 44 airframes were identical, but the V 40 was powered by a  Siemens-Halske Sh 11 7-cylinder radial and the V 44 by a  Bristol Lucifer 3-cylinder radial.  Both were nose-mounted, uncowled, and drove two-blade propellers.  External dimensions, apart from the exact length, were the same, and the weights were also similar.

Operational history
The V 40 and V 44 were amongst five LFG entries to the Round Germany Flight held in the summer of 1925, though only the LFG V 39 took take part.

Variants

 V 40  Siemens-Halske Sh 11 7-cylinder radial engine. One built. 
 V 44  Bristol Lucifer 3-cylinder radial engine. One built.

Specifications

References

1920s German sport aircraft
LFG V 40
High-wing aircraft
Single-engined tractor aircraft
Aircraft first flown in 1925